Football at the 2016 South Asian Games – Women's tournament
Below are the squads for the Women's football tournament at 2016 South Asian Games, hosted by India, which will take place between 5 February 2016 and 16 February 2016.

Coach:  Sajid Dar

Coach: Golam Robbani

 (Vice-captain)

 (Captain)

Coach:

Coach:  Dhruba KC

Coach:

See also
Football at the 2016 South Asian Games – Men's team squads

References

South Asian Games football squads
2016 in women's association football
Association football women's tournament squads